The Gulf Club Champions Cup, is a football league tournament for the Arabian Peninsula, it's a tournament for clubs. The 1989 edition was known as the Gulf Cooperation Council Club Tournament.

The tournament doubled up as the qualifying round of the 1989–90 Asian Club Championship. The winners would progress to the ACC's latter stages.

Al-Fanja won the tournament, but as in previous years, they did not apply to play in the Club Championship.

Results

 Fanja only played for GCC Tournament

All match were played in Bahrain.

Playoff for first place Asian Cup Group

Final

Winner

 
 

GCC Champions League
Gulf